Jean Tholey (born 16 November 1902, date of death unknown) was a French boxer. He competed in the 1924 Summer Olympics. In 1924, Tholey finished fourth in the lightweight class after losing the bronze medal bout to Frederick Boylstein.

References

External links
profile

1902 births
Year of death missing
Lightweight boxers
Olympic boxers of France
Boxers at the 1924 Summer Olympics
French male boxers